Jorge Francisco Birkner Ketelhohn (born 26 June 1990 in Buenos Aires, Argentina) is an alpine skier from Monaco. He will compete for Argentina at the 2014 Winter Olympics in all the alpine skiing events except the downhill.

Notes

References

External links 
 
 
 
 

1990 births
Living people
Argentine male alpine skiers
Olympic alpine skiers of Argentina
Alpine skiers at the 2014 Winter Olympics
Skiers from Buenos Aires